Congea is a small genus of flowering plants in the mint family, Lamiaceae, first described by William Roxburgh in 1820.

It contains vines native to southern China, the Himalayas, and Southeast Asia that are rarely seen in cultivation outside the 
tropics. One species, Congea tomentosa, is occasionally grown in large greenhouses, but this is mainly restricted to conservatories on large estates or botanic gardens.

Species
 Congea chinensis Moldenke - Yunnan, Myanmar
 Congea connata H.R.Fletcher - Thailand
 Congea forbesii King & Gamble - Malaysia, Sumatra
 Congea griffithiana Munir - Laos, Thailand, Myanmar, Malaysia; naturalized in Sri Lanka 
 Congea hansenii Moldenke -  Thailand
 Congea × munirii Moldenke - Vietnam    (C. chinensis × C. connata)
 Congea pedicellata Munir - Laos, Thailand, Vietnam; naturalized in Fiji
 Congea rockii Moldenke -  Thailand
 Congea siamensis H.R.Fletcher - Thailand, Myanmar
 Congea tomentosa Roxb., commonly called Shower Orchid, Shower of Orchids, or Wooly Congea. - Yunnan, Assam, Bangladesh, Indochina; naturalized in Central America, Colombia, Dominican Republic, Sri Lanka 
 Congea velutina Wight - Thailand, Myanmar, Malaysia, Sumatra
 Congea vestita Griff. - Indochina

References

External links

Lamiaceae
Lamiaceae genera
Lamiales of Asia